This was the first edition of the tournament since 1994. Lara Arruabarrena and Xenia Knoll won the title, defeating Annika Beck and Evgeniya Rodina in the final, 6–1, 3–6, [10–8].

Seeds 
The top seed received a bye into the quarterfinals.

Draw

Draw

References
 Draw

Ladies Championship Gstaad
WTA Swiss Open